The 9th Edward Jancarz Memorial was the 2005 version of the Edward Jancarz Memorial. It took place on 4 June in the Stal Gorzów Stadium in Gorzów Wielkopolski, Poland. The Memorial was won by Jason Crump who beat Rune Holta, Leigh Adams and Tony Rickardsson in the final.

Heat details 
 4 June 2005 (Saturday)
 Best Time: 62.68 - Rune Holta in Heat 4
 Attendance: 7,000
 Referee: Wojciech Grodzki

Heat after heat 
 (62.75) Crump, Jaguś, Kuciapa, Miśkowiak
 (63.69) Ruud, Chrzanowski, Paluch, Brzozowski
 (64.28) Baliński, Adams, Andersen, Rajkowski
 (62.68) Holta, Rickardsson, Hlib, Loram (F4)
 (63.47) Andersen, Crump, Paluch, Loram
 (63.18) Rickardsson, Chrzanowski, Miśkowiak, Rajkowski
 (64.06) Adams, Kuciapa, Hlib, Brzozowski
 (64.28) Holta, Baliński, Ruud, Jaguś
 (63.39) Holta, Chrzanowski, Adams, Crump
 (65.00) Miśkowiak, Hlib, Baliński, Paluch
 (62.87) Rickardsson, Ruud, Kuciapa, Andersen
 (65.84) Loram, Brzozowski, Rajkowski, Jaguś
 (64.81) Crump, Baliński, Rickardsson, Brzozowski
 (65.12) Adams, Miśkowiak, Loram, Ruud
 (65.56) Holta, Paluch, Kuciapa, Rajkowski
 (65.65) Jaguś, Andersen, Chrzanowski, Hlib (R2)
 (65.56) Crump, Ruud, Rajkowski, Hlib (R2)
 (64.91) Holta, Andersen, Miśkowiak, Brzozowski
 (65.53) Kuciapa, Baliński, Loram, Chrzanowski (R3)
 (65.68) Adams, Rickardsson, Paluch, Jaguś (R3)
 The Final (top four riders)
 (64,35) Crump, Holta, Adams, Rickardsson

See also 
 motorcycle speedway
 2005 in sports

References

External links 
 (Polish) Stal Gorzów Wlkp. official webside

Memorial
2005
Edward J